HD 75289 is a faint double star in the southern constellation of Vela. The primary component has a yellow hue and an apparent visual magnitude of 6.35. Under exceptionally good circumstances it might be visible to the unaided eye; however, usually binoculars are needed. The pair are located at a distance of 95 light years from the Sun based on parallax, and are drifting further away with a radial velocity of +10 km/s.

The brighter member, component A, is a G-type main-sequence star like the Sun with a stellar classification of G0V. In 1982 it was classified as a supergiant, but this proved erroneous. It has an age comparable to the Sun and is considered metal-rich, with a greater abundance of heavier elements compared to the Sun. The star has 14% more mass than the Sun and a 30% greater girth. It is spinning with a projected rotational velocity of 3 km/s, giving it a ~16 day rotation period. The star is radiating double the luminosity of the Sun from its photosphere at an effective temperature of 6,184 K.

In 2004, a co-moving stellar companion was identified, based on an earlier suggestion from 2001. However, the radial distance between the stars is unknown, so they are probably further apart. In any case, one revolution around the primary would take thousands of years to complete. The study that found the red dwarf also rules out any further stellar companions beyond 140 AU and massive brown dwarf companions from 400 AU up to 2,000 AU.

Planetary system
In 1999 a exoplanet HD 75289 b with half the mass of Jupiter was detected orbiting the primary by radial velocity method. This exoplanet is a typical hot Jupiter that takes only about 3.51 days to revolve at an orbital distance of 0.0482 AU.

References

External links
SIMBAD star entry, planet entry, component B entry


G-type main-sequence stars
M-type main-sequence stars
Planetary systems with one confirmed planet
Binary stars

Vela (constellation)
CD=−41 4507
075289
043177
3497
J08474038-4144119